Vailate is a comune (municipality) in the Province of Cremona in the Italian region Lombardy, located about  east of Milan and about  northwest of Cremona.

Vailate borders the following municipalities: Agnadello, Arzago d'Adda, Calvenzano, Capralba, Misano di Gera d'Adda, Torlino Vimercati.

Demographic evolution

References

External links
 www.comune.vailate.cr.it/

Cities and towns in Lombardy